National Route 132 is a national highway of Japan connecting Port of Kawasaki and Miyamaechō, Kawasaki-ku, Kawasaki in Japan, with a total length of 4.5 km (2.8 mi).

References

132
Roads in Kanagawa Prefecture